Curtis Northrup Strange (born January 30, 1955) is an American professional golfer and TV color commentator. He is the winner of consecutive U.S. Open titles and a member of the World Golf Hall of Fame and Virginia Sports Hall of Fame. He spent over 200 weeks in the top-10 of the Official World Golf Ranking between their debut in 1986 and 1990.

Amateur career
Strange and his identical twin brother, Allan, were born in Norfolk, Virginia. His father, a local country club owner, started him in golf at age 7. Strange graduated from Princess Anne High School in Virginia Beach, then enrolled at Wake Forest University in Winston-Salem, North Carolina. He played golf for the Demon Deacons and was part of the NCAA Championship team with Jay Haas and Bob Byman that Golf World has labeled "the greatest of all time". In 1974 Strange was ranked the #2 amateur in the country by Golf Digest. The following year he was ranked number #3. 

In the spring of 1976, Strange intended to transition from amateur to professional despite still being a junior in college. At this point, he was known for having one of the best amateur careers of all time. According to the golf columnist for The Charlotte Observer, Richard Sink, "Strange, only a junior, will leave behind a collegiate record perhaps unmatched." He finished in the top ten in all of his 25 college matches and finished in the top 5 in 21 of those. He won nine individual events and was the youngest NCAA Champion in golf at the time. In 1976, he was ranked #9 amateur in the country by Golf Digest.

Professional career
Strange was one of the leading players on the PGA Tour in the 1980s; 16 of his 17 tour victories took place in that decade. He topped the money list in 1985, 1987, and 1988, when he became the first to win a million dollars in official money in a season. His two majors were consecutive U.S. Opens in 1988 and 1989. Since World War II, only three golfers have successfully defended their titles at the U.S. Open; Brooks Koepka in 2018, Strange in 1989, and Ben Hogan in 1951.

The 1989 U.S. Open was Strange's last win on tour. In other majors, he led midway through the final round at The Masters in 1985, but finished two strokes back. Strange was also a runner-up at the PGA Championship in 1989, one stroke back. He played on five Ryder Cup teams (1983, 1985, 1987, 1989, and 1995) and captained the team in 2002.

Despite skipping the Open Championship several times in his prime, Strange played a considerable amount of international tournaments. He won the 1986 ABC Japan-U.S. Match, an event on the Japan Golf Tour that included many American pros. He also played extensively on the Australasian Tour. He won three events in Australia in the late 1980s and early 1990s and recorded runner-up finishes at the 1976 Australian Open, 1977 Colgate Champion of Champions, 1986 Air New Zealand Shell Open, and the 1990 Daikyo Palm Meadows Cup.

Like Henrik Stenson and Ben Hogan, Strange was a natural left-hander who played right-handed.

Later career and honors
After reaching the age of 50 in January 2005, Strange began play on the Champions Tour, remarking, "I was getting worse and said, 'To hell with it.'" His only top-five finishes came that first season; third place at the Constellation Energy Classic and a tie for fifth at the FedEx Kinko's Classic.

In 1997, he was hired as the lead golf analyst for ESPN/ABC, working alongside host Mike Tirico. He left due to a contract dispute before the 2004 U.S. Open, but rejoined ESPN/ABC at the 2008 U.S. Open, four years after he first left. In 2016, he was hired by Fox as a course reporter for their USGA championships.

In this capacity he has provided commentary for several notable events, including Tiger Woods' playoff win at the 1997 Mercedes Championships, David Duval's final round of 59 at the 1999 Bob Hope Chrysler Classic, Jean van de Velde's collapse at the 1999 Open Championship, Woods achieving the career grand slam at the 2000 Open Championship, Peter Jacobsen becoming one of the oldest Tour winners at age 49 during the 2003 Greater Hartford Open, Woods' U.S. Open winning performance in 2008 (early rounds), Tom Watson nearly winning The Open Championship at age 59 in 2009, and Phil Mickelson's final nine charge to win in 2013.

On April 18, 2007, Strange was elected to the World Golf Hall of Fame, and was inducted on November 12 at the World Golf Village in St. Augustine, Florida.

In May 2009, he was named to the Hampton Roads Sports Hall of Fame, which honors athletes, coaches and administrators who contributed to sports in southeastern Virginia.

Amateur wins
1974 Western Amateur, North and South Amateur, NCAA Division I Championship
1975 North and South Amateur, Eastern Amateur

Professional wins (29)

PGA Tour wins (17)

PGA Tour playoff record (6–3)

Japan Golf Tour wins (1)

PGA Tour of Australasia wins (3)

PGA Tour of Australasia playoff record (0–1)

South American Golf Circuit wins (1)
1981 Panama Open

Other wins (7)

Major championships

Wins (2)

1Defeated Faldo in 18-hole playoff; Strange: 71 (E), Faldo: 75 (+4).

Results timeline

LA = Low amateur
CUT = missed the halfway cut
WD = withdrew
"T" indicates a tie for a place.

Summary

Most consecutive cuts made – 13 (1987 Masters – 1990 U.S. Open)
Longest streak of top-10s – 2 (twice)

Results in The Players Championship

CUT = missed the halfway cut
WD = withdrew
DQ = disqualified
"T" indicates a tie for a place

U.S. national team appearances
Amateur
Eisenhower Trophy: 1974 (winners)
Walker Cup: 1975 (winners)

Professional
Ryder Cup: 1983 (winners), 1985, 1987, 1989 (tied), 1995, 2002 (non-playing captain)
Dunhill Cup: 1985, 1987, 1988, 1989 (winners), 1990, 1991, 1994
Four Tours World Championship: 1985 (winners), 1987 (winners), 1988 (winners), 1989 (winners)
UBS Cup: 2001 (winners), 2002 (winners), 2003 (tie), 2004 (winners)

Equipment
In 1988 when Strange won the U.S. Open, Ping  recognized him with a golden putter replica of the Ping Zing 2 he used to win. A second one was made and placed in the Ping Gold Putter Vault.

See also
Spring 1977 PGA Tour Qualifying School graduates
List of golfers with most PGA Tour wins

References

External links

American male golfers
Wake Forest Demon Deacons men's golfers
PGA Tour golfers
PGA Tour Champions golfers
Ryder Cup competitors for the United States
Winners of men's major golf championships
World Golf Hall of Fame inductees
Golf writers and broadcasters
Golfers from Virginia
Identical twins
Twin sportspeople
American twins
Princess Anne High School alumni
Sportspeople from Norfolk, Virginia
1955 births
Living people